Valy may refer to:
 Valy (Pardubice District), a village in the Pardubice Region of the Czech Republic
 Valy (Cheb District), a village in the Cheb Region of the Czech Republic
 Valy, a village in Karapchiv, Vyzhnytsia Raion, Ukraine

See also
 Vali (disambiguation)